The Secretary of the Navy's Advisory Subcommittee on Naval History was formally established in 1956 and is the second oldest of the historical advisory committee's within the United States Department of Defense.

History
Formally established as a committee of eleven civilians in 1956 as the Secretary of the Navy's Advisory Committee on Naval History, its direct and immediate antecedent was an ad hoc advisory committee that had met in 1952, 1954, and 1955. Its members are appointed by the Secretary of the Navy to review and advise on the current and future plans of both the Naval History and Heritage Command and the United States Marine Corps History Division of Marine Corps University. In 1996, the committee was made a subcommittee of the Department of Defense Historical Advisory Committee and reports directly to the Secretary of the Navy, and also to the Secretary of Defense through the Department of Defense Historical Advisory Committee.

Chairmen
The following, listed in chronological order, have served as chairmen of the committee. In those case where individuals have also served as individual members their names and dates are also shown separately for that service in the alphabetical list of members:

 Waldo G. Leland, 1955-1964
 Elmer L. Kayser, 1970-1972
 Walter Muir Whitehill, 1972-
 Richard W. Leopold
 William D. Wilkinson
 David Alan Rosenberg, 1995-2005
 John Hattendorf, 2006-2008
 Robert B. Pirie, Jr., 2009-

Members
The following is an alphabetical list of committee members, who have served since 1952, with their dates of service as members. Committee chairs are listed above with their dates as chairmen:

 Arthur D. Baker, III, 1985
 John D. Barnhardt, 1955-1963
 James Phinney Baxter III, 1952-1964
 CAPT Edward L. Beach, Jr., USN (ret.), 1992
 Whitfield J. Bell, jr, 1972-1980
 Samuel Flagg Bemis, 1955-1964
 David R. Bender, 1992
 Francis L. Berkeley, Jr., 1966-1982
 Julian P. Boyd, 1952-1966
 Marion L. Brewington, 1966-1974
 RADM Thomas A. Brooks, USN (ret.),  2003-2007
 CDR Wesley A. Brown, CEC, USN (ret.), 1996-2002
 Frank G. Burke, 1996-2002
 J. Revell Carr, 1996
 Charles C. Chadbourn, III, 2008-
 LTGEN G. Ronald Christmas, USMC (ret.), 2008-
 Edward E. Dale, 1952
 John C. Dann, 1992
 VADM Robert F. Dunn, 1996-2002
 VADM George W. Emery, USN (ret.), 1997-2006
 James T. Farrell, 1954
 James A. Field, Jr., 1980-1985
 RADM Mack C. Gaston, USN (ret.), -2007
 RADM Russell W. Gorman, USN (ret.), 1992-1996
 Jose-Marie Griffiths, 1996-2002
 Joy Bright Hancock, 1976-1985
 CAPT R. Robinson Harris, USN (ret.), 2002
 Caryl P. Haskins, 1970-1982
 John Hattendorf, 2004-2005
 Robert Henry, 1954
 Jim Dan Hill, 1954-1982
 RADM William J. Holland, Jr., USN (ret.), 2008-
 Christine Hughes, 2004-
 Donald D. Jackson, 1972-1980
 Beverely Schreiber Jacoby, 1996-2005
 Richard L. Jautras, 1992
 CAPT W. Spencer Johnson IV, USN (ret.), 2007-
 Richard L. Jutras, 1996
 RADM John T. Kavanaugh, SC, USN (ret.),  - 2007
 Elmer L. Kayser, 1952-1976
 John H. Kemble, 1961-1985
 Tibor Kerekes, 1952
 RADM John M. Kersch, USN (ret.), 2002-2005
 VADM William P. Lawrence, USN (ret.), 1992
 Susan Livingstone,  - 2007
 J. P. London, 2007-
 Burt Logan, 2003-2007
 Leonard W. Labaree, 1966-1969
 Waldo G. Leland, 1952-1964
 Richard W. Leopold, 1955-1982
 William E. Lingelbach, 1956-1960
 Augustus P. Loring, 1982-1985
 Dumas Malone, 1954
 Jan E. Mandeville, 1985
 Vera D. Mann, 1992-1996
 AMB J. William Middendorf II, 1992-1996
 VADM Gerald E. Miller, USN (ret.), 1992
 Elting E. Morison, 1972-1976
 Allan Nevins, 1956-1969
 Michael A. Palmer, - 2007
 Howard H. Peckham, 1972-1976
 Norman Polmar, 2007
 Forrest C. Pogue, 1970-1985
 Fred H. Rainbow, 2007-
 ADM J. Paul Reason, USN (ret.), 2008-
 James R. Reckner, 2002-
 Clark G. Reynolds, 1992-
 David Alan Rosenberg, 1993-2005
 MGEN Clifford L. Stanley, USMC (ret.), 2008-
 William Lloyd Stearman, 2004-2008
 Daniel F. Stella, 1992
 William N. Still, Jr., 1996-2005
 Gordon B. Turner, 1972-1980
 Betty Miller Unterberger, 1992-1996
 Walter P. Webb, 1954
 Walter Muir Whitehill, 1952-1972
 William D. Wilkinson, 1996
 Virginia Steele Wood,   2002 - 2007 
 CAPT Channing M. Zucker, USN (ret.), 2007 -

Charter
CHARTER OF THE SECRETARY OF THE NAVY’S ADVISORY SUBCOMMITTEE ON NAVAL HISTORY
 A. Official Designation: The Subcommittee shall be known as the Secretary of the Navy's Advisory Subcommittee on Naval History (hereinafter referred to as the SNAS).
 B. Background, Objectives, and Scope of Activities: Formally established as a committee of eleven civilians in 1956 as the Secretary of the Navy's Advisory Committee on Naval History, this body had as its direct and immediate antecedent an ad hoc advisory committee that met in 1952, 1954, and 1955. In 1996, the Committee was made a subcommittee of the Department of Defense Historical Advisory Committee. The current SNAS reports to the Department of Defense Historical Advisory Committee through the Secretary of the Navy. The SNAS, under the provisions of the Federal Advisory Committee Act of 1972 (5 U.S.C., Appendix, as amended), shall provide independent advice and recommendations on matters pertaining to preserving the heritage and legacy of the Naval Service and disseminating its rich history to the Service and the American public, to include professional standards, methodology, program priorities, and cooperative relationships in the Marine Corps and Navy's historical research and publication, museum, archival, archeological, library, manuscript collection, rare book collection, art collection, preservation, and curatorial
activities. The Secretary of the Navy may act upon the SNAS's advice and recommendations.

 C. Committee Membership: The SNAS shall be composed of not more than fifteen members,
who are appointed by the Secretary of the Navy on the advice of the Assistant Secretary of
the Navy (Installations & Environment). The SNAS shall submit nominations to the
Assistant Secretary of the Navy (Installations & Environment). The Director of Naval
History and the President of the Marine Corps University shall make their recommendations
for membership to the SNAS, as a nominating committee. Nominees will include individuals
who have broad managerial experience, vision, and understanding in one or more of the
following areas: military and maritime history, archives, museology, art, library science,
information technology. Members may also include former senior civilian Department of the
Navy officials and retired Navy and Marine Corps personnel. Members appointed by the
Secretary of the Navy, who are not Federal officers or employees, shall serve as Special
Government Employees under the authority of 5 U.S.C. § 3109, and shall be appointed for a
term of four years with the possibility of a one- to two-year extension. With the exception of travel and per diem for official travel, Subcommittee Members shall serve without compensation. The SNAS shall elect its own Chair and Vice-chair from its appointed members.

 D. Committee Meetings: The SNAS shall meet at the call of the Alternate Designated Federal
Officer, in consultation with the Chairperson. The estimated number of SNAS meetings is
one per year. The Alternate Designated Federal Officer shall be a full-time or permanent part-time DoD employee, and shall be appointed in accordance with established DoD policies and
procedures. The Designated Federal Officer and/or Alternate Designated Federal Officer
shall attend all SNAS meetings.

 E. Duration of the Subcommittee: The need for this advisory function is on a continuing basis; however, it is subject to renewal every two years.
 F. Agency Support: The Department of the Navy, through the Office of the Assistant Secretary of the Navy (Installations & Environment) shall provide support as deemed necessary for the performance of the Committee's functions, and shall ensure compliance with the requirements of 5 U.S.C., Appendix, as amended.
 G. Termination Date: The Subcommittee shall terminate upon completion of its mission or two
years from the date this Charter is filed, whichever is sooner, unless it is extended by the
Secretary of the Navy or the Department of Defense Historical Advisory Committee.

 H. Operating Costs: The operating costs will include travel costs and contract support for the SNAS. The estimated annual personnel support costs to the Department of Defense are 0.3 full-time equivalents (FTEs).
 I. Recordkeeping: The records of the SNAS shall be handled according to section 2, General
Records Schedule 26 and appropriate DoD policies and procedures. These records shall be
available for public inspection and copying, subject to the Freedom of Information Act of
1966 (5 U.S.C. § 552, as amended).

 J. Charter/Revisions Approval Process: Subcommittees of the DoD Historical Advisory
Committee are authorized to approve their own charters but they cannot operate
independently of the DoD Historical Advisory Committee. Regardless of the charter, SNAS remains a subcommittee of the parent committee. This Subcommittee Charter was initially approved unanimously by all SNAS members present at the SNAS executive session that took place on 12 September 2008. Revisions may be made with the concurrence of a vote of two-thirds of the appointed members and will be forwarded for information by the SNAS to the DoD Historical Advisory Committee when such revisions are made.

 K. Charter Filed: 12 September 2008.

Sources
 Richard W. Leopold, "Historians and the Federal Government: Historical Advisory Committees: State, Defense, and the Atomic Energy Commission," The Pacific Historical Review, vol. 44, No. 3. (Aug 1975), pp. 373–385.

United States Navy
Military historiography
History organizations based in the United States